(formerly known as  until January 2012) is a pre-debut training group established by Japanese entertainment agency Up-Front Group within Hello! Project in 2004.

Members

Hello Pro Kenshusei Hokkaido members 
 none

Former members

Debuted members

Past members

Discography

Albums

DVD singles

References

External links 
 
 List of Hello Pro Kenshusei members
 

Hello! Project
Musical groups established in 2004
2004 establishments in Japan
Japanese pop music groups
Japanese girl groups
Japanese idol groups
Hello! Project groups
Musical groups from Tokyo
Child musical groups